Werner Junck (28 December 1895 – 6 August 1976) was a German general in the Luftwaffe during World War II and commander of Fliegerführer Irak. He claimed five aerial victories during World War I.

Origin
Werner Junck was born in Magdeburg, the Province of Saxony, the Kingdom of Prussia, the German Empire, on 28 December 1895.

Career

World War 1
He was interested in aviation before World War I, and learned to fly in 1913. However, he entered military service as an artillery officer as World War I began. In 1916, he was posted to Flieger-Abteilung (Flier Detachment) 33 of the Die Fliegertruppen (the flying troops).

In October 1916, as Die Fliegertruppen morphed into the Luftstreitkräfte, Junck was transferred to a fighter squadron, Jagdstaffel 8. He scored his first aerial victory on 24 April 1917, downing a 20 Squadron FE.2d east of Ypres. He rose to command of the jasta on 4 April 1918 and stayed with it through war's end. Junck would be wounded three times and shoot down four SPADs in northern France before the Armistice. His five victories made him an ace. His three wounds qualified him for a Silver Wound Badge, though there is no record it was awarded to him.

Interwar period
Werner Junck was one of the instructors at the Luftwaffe'''s secret Lipetsk fighter-pilot school in the Soviet Union from 1925 to 1928. Junck also participated in the first, third and fourth FAI International Tourist Plane Contest Challenge 1929 (27th place) Challenge 1932 (14th place) and Challenge 1934 (6th place). In 1934, he joined the nascent Luftwaffe at the rank of major. By 1938-1939, he was an Oberstleutnant commanding Jagdgruppe 334.

World War 2
Junck's best-known role in World War II is commanding Fliegerführer Irak, the aerial component of Sonderstab F, a military mission sent to Iraq in May 1941 to aid Rashid Ali's rebel government after it forced out the pro-British regime the previous month. On 29 May they retreated from the country. Later in the war, he led forces in the fighting against the Allied forces in Normandy. 

Later Years
In 1960 he was appointed honorary chairman of the Gemeinschaft der Jagdflieger, the Association of Fighter Pilots.

Awards
 Iron Cross (1939) 2nd and 1st Class
 Knight's Cross of the Iron Cross on 9 June 1944 as Generalmajor and commanding general of the II. Jagdkorps

See also
Fliegerführer Irak
Special Staff F

Endnotes

References

 Franks, Norman; Bailey, Frank W.; Guest, Russell (1993). Above the Lines: The Aces and Fighter Units of the German Air Service, Naval Air Service and Flanders Marine Corps, 1914–1918. Oxford:Grub Street. , .
 Krzyżan, Marian (1988). Międzynarodowe turnieje lotnicze 1929-1934''. Warsaw: WKiŁ. .
 
 

1895 births
1976 deaths
German World War I flying aces
German test pilots
Lieutenant generals of the Luftwaffe
Luftwaffe World War II generals
Generals of Aviators
Recipients of the Knight's Cross of the Iron Cross
Luftstreitkräfte personnel
Reichswehr personnel
Prussian Army personnel
Military personnel from Magdeburg
People from the Province of Saxony
Burials at Munich Waldfriedhof